John P. McVeane (1842 – May 10, 1864) was an American soldier who fought in the American Civil War. McVeane received his country's highest award for bravery during combat, the Medal of Honor. McVeane's medal was won for capturing the flag from a Confederate Color bearer at Fredericksburg Heights. He was posthumously honored with the award on September 21, 1870.

McVeane was born in Toronto, Ontario, Canada. He joined the 49th New York Volunteer Infantry from Buffalo, New York in August 1861. He was commissioned as a 2nd Lieutenant in October 1863, and was mortally wounded during the Battle of the Wilderness. McVeane was one of 30 Canadians to win the Medal of Honor.

Medal of Honor citation

See also
 List of American Civil War Medal of Honor recipients: M–P

References

1842 births
1896 deaths
American Civil War recipients of the Medal of Honor
Pre-Confederation Canadian emigrants to the United States
Canadian-born Medal of Honor recipients
People of New York (state) in the American Civil War
Military personnel from Buffalo, New York
People from Old Toronto
Union Army soldiers
Union military personnel killed in the American Civil War
United States Army Medal of Honor recipients